A headbutt is a targeted strike with the head, typically (when intentional) involving the use of robust parts of the headbutter's cranium as the area of impact. The most effective headbutts strike the most sensitive areas of an opponent, such as the nose, using the stronger bones in the forehead (frontal bone) or the back of the skull (occipital or parietal bone).

Mechanics 
Headbutts can be used from close range such as from the clinch, or on the ground. They are typically applied to the head of the opponent, since the head is often a readily available target and has several sensitive areas, but can be delivered to any part of the body. It is considered a quick, very effective but risky maneuver, as a misplaced strike can also cause injury to the person delivering the headbutt. 

An effective headbutt can be performed with a forward, rising, sideways or backwards motion; each being effective from different positions. Parts of the cranium with thick bone and high local curvature make for good weapon areas, and these include the forehead near the hairline, the outboard curved part of the parietal bone, and the occiput. Ideal targets are usually the fragile areas of the head, including the bridge of the nose, the cheekbones, the hinge area of the jaw, the temple, and the top edge of the eye socket. 

Hitting the opponent's teeth or mouth is likely to cause mutual damage.  The chin of the enemy is also a generally bad position to headbutt unless striking from below up into the bottom of the chin, similar to an uppercut. In the United Kingdom, a headbutt is sometimes referred to as a Glasgow kiss, a tongue-in-cheek reference to the city of Glasgow's violent reputation.

In fiction 
The character Yosser Hughes in Boys from the Blackstuff was noted for headbutting people and inanimate objects. In one scene, his young daughter headbutts a social worker. Headbutts often feature in professional wrestling and fighting video games.

In The Mummy Returns, Evelyn O'Connell headbutts some opponents, which she learned from her husband Rick O'Connell.

In nature 

Rams are well known for butting with their heads and horns. From this, the terms battering ram and hydraulic ram are derived. Many males in various animal species employ butting during courtship to show off their strength to potential mates.

Cats engage in a gentle behavior that resembles headbutting, where they hit another person or animal with their forehead scent glands to mark their territory with pheromones.

In sports

Contact sports 
Headbutts are generally forbidden in most contact sports and, if performed, result in penalties and even disqualifications. However, it is a strike allowed in Burmese boxing, capoeira, muay boran, combat sambo, some full-contact karate rulesets/variants - namely Kūdō - and in the self-defence art of krav maga.  In traditional boxing, official game style regulations are used if the headbutt is accidental.  If a match does not reach halfway, it is no contest.  If it reaches past the official match point, then scores will be calculated.

It is also the primary focus of the Eritrean martial art Testa. Headbutts were a commonly used technique in vale tudo and mixed martial arts before the introduction of the unified rules of MMA. Similarly, although the art itself forbids any kind of strikes, some masters of judo taught the use of headbutts under the name of atama ate waza, as demonstrated by Kyuzo Mifune and Mikinosuke Kawaishi.

Association football
Intentional headbutting is illegal in association football and even attempting one will warrant dismissal by a red card. Famously, during the 2006 FIFA World Cup Final between Italy and France, French team captain Zinedine Zidane headbutted Italian player Marco Materazzi, after an angry exchange. Zidane received a red card. It would be his last professional game, and ended his career on a "discordant" note. This moment was later immortalized by a sculpture titled "Headbutt" by French artist Adel Abdessemed.

Ice hockey
Headbutting is not allowed in ice hockey. In the National Hockey League even an unsuccessful attempt at headbutting warrants a double minor. An actual headbutt is a major penalty and a game misconduct, and a match penalty is mandatory if the referee rules that there was reckless endangerment.

Handball
On March 3, 2014, Milena Knežević headbutted Anita Görbicz during the last seconds of the game between ŽRK Budućnost and Győri ETO KC in the EHF Women's Champions League group stage. Knežević was banned for the next two matches.

Wrestling
On April 9, 2017,  Japanese wrestler Katsuyori Shibata headbutted Kazuchika Okada during their match at Sakura Genesis 2017. The headbutt was so hard that it caused Shibata to start bleeding from the forehead. After the match, Shibata collapsed backstage, from where he was taken to the hospital and diagnosed with a subdural hematoma.

References

Further reading
 Moffatt, Gerald. Headbutts or How to be a Nutter. stickgrappler.tripod.com. URL last accessed February 2, 2006.
 WonderHowTo How to Headbutt like Kiefer Sutherland

External links

 Self Defense: The Standard Headbutt 

Strikes (martial arts)
Skull
Head gestures
Articles containing video clips